George Burnett may refer to:

George Burnett (writer) (1776?–1811), English nonconformist minister, known as a writer
George Burnett (officer of arms) (1822–1890), Lord Lyon King of Arms
George Burnett Barton (1836–1901), Australian lawyer
George H. Burnett (1853–1927), Oregon Supreme Court Chief Justice
George Ritter Burnett (1858–1908), United States Army officer and Medal of Honor recipient
George Burnett (ice hockey) (born 1962), National Hockey League coach
George Murray Burnett (1921–1980), mathematician and chemist

See also
George Barnett (disambiguation)